Greater Tzaneen Local Municipality is located in the Mopani District Municipality of Limpopo province, South Africa. The seat of the municipality is Tzaneen.

Main places
The 2001 census divided the municipality into the following main places:

Politics 
The municipal council consists of sixty-nine members elected by mixed-member proportional representation. Thirty-five councillors are elected by first-past-the-post voting in thirty-five wards, while the remaining thirty-four are chosen from party lists so that the total number of party representatives is proportional to the number of votes received. In the election of 3 August 2016 the African National Congress (ANC) won a majority of fifty-two seats on the council.
The following table shows the results of the election.

References

External links 
 Official homepage

Local municipalities of the Mopani District Municipality